The Korea–Australia Free Trade Agreement (KAFTA) is a bilateral agreement seeking to reduce trade and investment barriers between Australia and South Korea. The agreement, which came into effect on the 12th of December 2014 provides Australian goods exporters, service providers and investors with significantly improved access to the South Korean market. The trade agreement stems from decades of bilateral relations, encompassing security, trade and diplomatic ties from 1962, when then President Park Chung-Hee introduced a series of five-year plans designed to spur globalisation efforts and industrial development in Korea following the end of the Korean War.

Historical Background 
Before the Korean War began on the 25 June 1950, Australian involvement in the Korean region was very limited, with the first documented contact between Korea and Australia occurring in 1889 when a group of missionaries from Australia arrived in Busan.  Bilateral relations between Australia and the ROK were fostered by both Australia's involvement in the UN Commission on Korea (1947) and during the Korean War (1950–53), with approximately 17000 Australian soldiers serving to aid the ROK during the Korean War . 1961 saw the establishment of full diplomatic relations between Australia and the ROK with The ROK consulate general in Sydney elevated to embassy status and the establishment of the first Korean ambassador in April 1962. Similarly, Australia established its embassy in Seoul in June 1962, with 2021 marking the 60th anniversary of full diplomatic ties between Australia and the ROK. The economic link between Australia & the ROK was also forged in the 1960s, when the ROK's rapid industrialization due to President Park Chung-Hee series of five-year plans required vast amounts of raw materials that could be supplied by Australia in substantial quantities. Historically, migration has underlined relations between Australia and the ROK, Korean migration to Australia began around the 1970 and has since increased over the decades with the population of Korean immigrants growing from 60 in 1970 to approximately 72 963 people of Korean ethnic origin having migrated under various categories including skilled and business migration. This shared bilateral history of Australia and Korea culminated over the five-year negotiation period of KAFTA, encompassing all aspects and provisions of the FTA, beginning with the Australian Labor Party Government under Kevin Rudd in 2009 and concluding under the Australian Liberal Party Government of Tony Abbot. Korea is now Australia's fourth largest trading partner and shares a variety of economic, strategic and political interests in the Asia-Pacific and global spheres.

The Agreement  
Australian Trade Minister Andrew Robb and Korean Trade Minister Yoon Sang-jick, concluded negotiations on the Agreement in early December 2013 and the legally verified text of the agreement was initialed by Chief Negotiators on 10 February 2014. In April 2014, the Australian Prime Minister Tony Abbott led a trade delegation to Japan, South Korea and China. The three economies accounted for more than half of all of Australia's two-way trade. On the South Korean leg of the mission, Abbott signed the Australia Korea Free Trade Agreement (KAFTA) with the government of Park Geun-hye in Seoul on 8 April. The agreement came into force on 12 December 2014.

According to Australia's Department of Foreign Affairs and Trade, Australia and Korea have "one of the strongest and most complementary trading relationships in the Asia-Pacific region. The Korea-Australia Free Trade Agreement (KAFTA) reduces trade and investment barriers, making it easier for Australians to do business with Korea – our 4th largest trading partner."

Provisions 
This section provides an overview of the key provisions of KAFTA including:

Trade in goods 
Chapter 2 of the KAFTA agreement outlines the provisions of the agreement regarding "Trade in goods". The articles under this section outline the way in which trade can be conducted under the free trade agreement that is KAFTA.  For example, article 2.3 'Elimination of Custom duties' outlines that 'neither Party shall increase any existing customs duty, or adopt any new customs duty, on an originating good.' As well as that 'each Party shall progressively eliminate its customs duties on originating goods.'  Similarly, article 2.9 'Export Duties, Taxes or Other Charges' outlines that 'Neither Party shall adopt or maintain any duty, tax or other charge on the export of any good to the territory of the other Party, unless the duty, tax or charge is also adopted or maintained on the good when destined for domestic consumption.'

Rules of Origin and Origin Procedures 
This section of provisions relates to the protocols surrounding rules of origin and origin procedures within the KAFTA agreement. Rules of Origin and Origin Procedures are criteria which determine the origins of a good as well as the general requirements and conditions for a good to be traded as something that originated from a nation. The provisions of Rules of Origin and Origin Procedures within The KAFTA Agreement are outlined in this section and set the precedent for "Originating Goods", "Wholly Obtained Goods", and the "Regional Value Content". This section also provisions Origin Procedures including the "Certificate of Origin", "Authorized Bodies", "Discrepancies and Variations" as well as "Record Keeping Requirements", which are deemed essential by both nations in maintaining a productive trade relationship.

Customs Administration and Trade Facilitation 
The objective of the provisions under the section Customs Administration and Trade Facilitation are to for both Australia and South Korea:

Simplify the customs procedures of the cooperating states.
Ensure predictability, consistency and transparency in the application of customs laws, regulations and administrative procedures of the Parties.
Ensure the efficient and expeditious clearance of goods.
Facilitate trade between the Parties.
Promote cooperation between the customs administrations of Australia and South Korea.

In this section, the above objectives are attained by the provision of transparency measures, the harmonization of documents and data elements, the use of Automated Systems in the Paperless Trading Environment, Appeal Procedures, all of which are encapsulated by the KAFTA agreement.

Investment 
The section covers the provisions pertaining to investment within and between Australia and South Korea. It encapsulates the majority of KAFTAs provisions regarding the financial sector, including National Treatment, which relates to the way in which each nations financial institution shall accord to investors of the other nation with treatment no less favorable than that it accords to its own investors.

Similarly, the Minimum Standard of Treatment clause within the Investment provision notes that "Each Party shall accord to covered investments treatment in accordance with the customary international law minimum standard of treatment of aliens, including fair and equitable treatment and full protection and security."

Cooperation 
The objective of the section on Cooperation within the KAFTA FTA is to facilitate bilateral cooperation and promote an exploration of new cooperative activities between Australian and South Korea in the fields of agriculture, fisheries and forestry, building on top of already existing relationships in the political and business world between the two states to support mutual development and economic growth. This section on cooperation places large emphasis on cooperation in the industries of agriculture and Energy and Mineral Resources with the establishment of a joint Committee on Agricultural Cooperation as well as a joint Committee on Energy and Mineral Resources Cooperation.

Outcomes

Australian Goods Exporters 

Due to KAFTA's provisions, around 99 per cent of goods exported from Australia to Korea are authorized to enter duty-free and/or with preferential access. For Australia's agricultural sector, tariffs were eliminated on Korean importation of raw sugar, bottled wine, wheat and some horticulture. Australia's beef industry has benefited from KAFTA with the ROK progressively reducing the 40 per cent tariff on beef by January 1, 2028. Australia's dairy industry has also seen benefits, receiving duty free quotas for cheese, butter and infant formula. The manufacturing, resources and energy sectors of Australia's economy have benefited as well, with the removal of all tariffs on their export to Korea progressively phasing out by January 1, 2023, these include tariffs on liquefied natural gas (LNG), unwrought aluminum and automotive parts. Tariffs on Australian pharmaceutical products have also been eliminated.

Australian Services Providers 
KAFTA has provided Australian services exporters with preferential treatment in the Korean market, benefiting sectors including finance, legal, telecommunications and education. Outcomes include law and accounting firms have the capacity to establish representative offices in the ROK. On the December 12th, 2016, firms were given permission under the FTA to "enter into cooperative agreements with local law firms". The agreement also stipulates that Australian firm may establish joint ventures and hire local lawyers. For Australian Accountants, KAFTA has made it possible for them to establish offices in Korea and to provide consulting services on both international and Australian accounting laws in Korea. The agreement stipulated that by 12 December 2019, Australian accountants were able to work and invest within accounting firms in South Korea. KAFTA has enabled Australian education and engineering sectors to increase their capacity in the Korean market due to "commitments to guarantee existing market access for Australian providers and work towards improving mutual recognition of qualifications." In May 2015, Engineers Australia signed an agreement with the Korean Government which enhanced the recognition of Australian engineering professionals in the ROK.

Investors 
According to the Australian Department of Foreign Affairs & Trade KAFTA has improved prospects for Australian investors/investments in Korea and Korean investors/investments in Australia. The FTA denotes that the ROK through the progressive reduction of market access barriers will provide greater entry for Australian's into the Korean market, similarly, the screening threshold for Korean investors in non-sensitive sectors has been loosened by Australia. The agreement also stipulates provisions to ensure "non-discrimination, and protection and security for investments". to enhance protection and certainty for Australian and Korean investors. Additionally, the Australian government in the FTA has altered the screening threshold for private Korean investors in "non-sensitive" sectors from 252 million AUD to $1.134 billion AUD. A key clause which has been an outcome of merit for the KAFTA agreement is the establishment of a "negative list" regime which simply presumes that a financial service is allowed "unless specifically prohibited and commits Korea to allow new financial services it would permit its own financial institutions to provide."

Regional Security 
Whilst an FTA is principally economic in nature and an arrangement for liberalized trade, it often triggers security implications. The signing of KAFTA also underlines the shared security concerns of both Australia and Korea in the Indo-Pacific and the Korean Peninsula. Being two significant middle powers in the Asia-Pacific region, Australia and the ROK share strategic interests and have served in conflicts and peace keeping exercises in relation to non-proliferation of weapons of mass destruction as well as events on the Korean peninsula that have threatened regional security. The frequency and tempo of military discussions, training exercises and industry cooperation is increasing between Australia and the ROK since KAFTAs inception. Similarly, the round of biennial foreign and defense minister meetings in 2019 placed emphasis on a "common strategic outlook". The signing of KAFTA has contributed to the recognition of Australia and the ROKs relationship being elevated to Comprehensive Strategic Partnership.

National Attitudes

Australian Attitudes 
Attitudes towards the KAFTA free trade agreement have been both positive and concerned since its signing. The Australian Embassy in South Korea reported that after a year of the FTA, "it is already making a big impact", Citing statistics that Koreas exports to Australia rose by 7.5%. Similarly, Australian consumers have benefited from a larger access to Korean products, creating a positive attitude within the existing Korean population in Australia towards the agreement. Australian attitudes are also positive due to agricultural exports like beef, nuts and Brussels sprouts steadily increasing, creating a larger market for Australia's agricultural industry. KAFTA has also been viewed positively by Australians because Australian's stands to benefit from a robust South Korea more than many due to strong two-way merchandise trade, services trade and direct investment growth as well as the growth of people-to-people links formed by KAFTA. 

Some Australian attitudes have been more concerned. With Labor minister Penny Wong suggesting Australia's free trade agreement with South Korea should be scrutinized in greater depth. Citing a clause in the agreement which grants the Korean Government the right to reimpose large tariffs on Australian beef if exports grow by more than 2% a year. Similarly, Liberal backbencher at the time of KAFTAs signing Sharman Stone who represented the electorate of Murray in Victoria, a large agricultural electorate, criticised the FTA for failing to deliver reductions on a variety of Australian food exports.

Korean Attitudes 
In 2014 KAFTA elevated the status of the economic relationship between South Korea and Australia, with South Korea becoming Australia's fourth largest trading partner as a result. Economically this has created a positive sentiment in the Korean market, with greater access to Australian mining and agricultural goods. Similarly South Korean Attitudes have been overall positive with Migration and education enriching the relationship between the two nations in the years since KAFTAs signing. Strategically, South Korea sits in a precarious position and the security relationship formed through KAFTA and diplomatic alignment has been a positive influence strategically for South Korea. Leading President Moon Jae-in to describe Australia as Korea's "everlasting friend and partner".

References

Australia–South Korea relations
Free trade agreements of South Korea
Free trade agreements of Australia
Abbott Government
Treaties concluded in 2014
2014 in Australian law
2014 in South Korea
Asian-Australian culture
Global governance